In military terms, 120th Division or 120th Infantry Division may refer to:

 120th Division (People's Republic of China)
 120th Division (Imperial Japanese Army)
 120th Guards Rifle Division (Soviet Union)